Forward was the second album from Turn, a Meath-based indie rock band. Their first album had seen a large interest from Ireland and the UK but it seemed to die away as quickly as it rose due to poor marketing and promotion from Infectious Records. The band were dropped from Infectious Records and created Nurture Records in order to release music. After this, the band struggled to finance and produce 2001's In Position EP, but the EP managed to secure a loyal fan base in Ireland and constant touring helped the band get back on their feet and start recording Forward in 2002. However, tragedy again struck the band when original bass player Gavin Fox left to join Idlewild.

The album was finished in early 2003 and released to rave reviews and strong sales, entering the Irish charts at No. 8. The album is considered Turn's strongest of their catalogue and showed a massive musical growth from their debut, Antisocial.

Track listing
 You Got Style (5:11)
 Dumb As It Is (3:06)
 Harder (3:13)
 Summer Song (2:40)
 In Position (2:54)
 Without You (4:01)
 Another Year Over (2:54)
 Ain't It A Love (2:44)
 Can't Keep Waiting (2:38)
 I Close My Eyes (4:39)
 Even Though (4:17)
 Forward

Trivia 
Forward is the highest selling Turn album to date and was the only one of the three recorded without a record company being involved.

Original bassist Gavin Fox left the band on New Year's Eve 2002 and was replaced by ex-Skindive bassist Alan Lee. Lee stayed with the band for two years before being replaced by Ciaran Kavanagh from Irish band The Rags.

"No More" is called "I Close My Eyes" on the CD because Ollie Cole couldn't remember the name of the song on the day the artwork was being done.

Line-up 
Ollie Cole - Vocals, guitar, piano
Ian Melady - Drums, backing vocals
Gavin Fox - Bass

Alan Lee played live supporting the album but joined just when recording was finished.

Production 
 Producer, Engineer, Mixer: Marc Carolan (MC)
 Mastered by Nick Webb (at Abbey Road)
 Recorded at Sun Studios, Dublin,
 Mixed at Grouse Lodge and Pulse Recording Studio,
 Masterered at Abbey Road Studios, London.

References 

2003 albums
Turn (band) albums